(Pentamethylcyclopentadienyl)aluminium(I) is an organometallic compound with the formula Al(CMe) ("Me" is a methyl group; CH). The compound is often abbreviated to AlCp* or Cp*Al, where Cp* is the pentamethylcyclopentadienide anion (CMe). Discovered in 1991 by Dhmeier et al., AlCp* serves as the first ever documented example of a room temperature stable monovalent aluminium compound. In its isolated form, Cp*Al exists as the tetramer [Cp*Al], and is a yellow crystal that decomposes at temperatures above 100 °C but also sublimes at temperatures above 140 °C.

Synthesis 
The earliest documented synthesis and characterization of Cp*Al was by Dohmeier et al. in 1991, where four equivalents of AlCl in toluene/diethyl ether is reacted with two equivalents of 2[Mg(Cp*)] to give [Cp*Al] as yellow crystals:

Despite the above synthetic scheme successfully producing tetrameters of [Cp*Al] at reasonable yields (44%), its use of AlCl proved problematic, as AlCl synthesis requires harsh conditions and its reactive nature makes storage a challenge. As such, more facile ways of synthesising the [Cp*Al] tetramer were discovered, and required the reduction of Cp*AlX (X = Cl, Br, I) by a metal (K when X = Cl) or a metal alloy (Na/K alloys when X = Br, I):

More exotic ways of synthesizing [Cp*Al] include the controlled disproportionation of an Al(II) dialane into constituent Al(I) and Al(III) products. For example, reacting dialane [Cp*AlBr] with a Lewis base such as pyridine the Lewis base stabilized [Cp*AlBr] and [Cp*Al].

Monomeric Cp*Al has also been isolated in a solid Ar matrix by heating [Cp*Al] in toluene to 133 °C and spraying the resultant vapours with Ar onto a copper block kept at 12 K.

Structure and bonding 
X-ray crystallographic data determined Cp*Al to exist exclusively as a tetramer in its solid state. This tetramer, [Cp*Al], consists of an Al tetrahedron, and the Cp* rings are ŋ-coordinated to the aluminium(I) cation such that the planes of the CMe rings are approximately parallel to the opposite base of the Al tetrahedron. The perpendicular distance between Al and the Cp* ring was determined through crystallography to range from 199.7 to 203.2 pm, with a mean value of 201.5 pm. The Al-Al bond in [Cp*Al] is 276.9 pm, which is slightly shorter than that of metallic aluminium, which has an Al-Al bond length of 286 pm. Additionally, the Al-Al bond in [Cp*Al] is significantly shorter than other oligomeric and polymeric Group III M(I)-ŋ-Cp* compounds such as octahedral [InCp*] (394, 336 pm), dimeric [InCp*] (363.1 pm), and polymeric [TlCp*] (641 pm), indicating a significantly larger interaction between aluminium atoms in [Cp*Al] than monovalent Cp* compounds of In(I) and Tl(I). Additional characterization that has been performed include Raman spectroscopy, which detected a Raman active breathing vibration (A, 377 cm-1) of the Al tetrahedron in [Cp*Al].

Natural bond orbital (NBO) analysis of [Cp*Al] and [Cp*Al] using B3LYP/6-31G(d,p) calculated the average charge transfer per Cp* fragment to an Al atom to be 0.657 and 0.641 respectively. This is slightly higher than the charge transfers calculated on [CpAl] and [Cp*Al] (0.630 and 0.591 respectively). NBO calculation of the HOMO-LUMO gap in [Cp*Al] also revealed a significant decreasing in the tetrameric [Cp*Al] complex compared to the monomeric [Cp*Al] (4.36 compared to 5.49), which is consistent with density functional theory calculations of analogous systems including superatom complexes of gold, aluminium and gallium. Atoms in molecules (AIM) calculations calculate the Al-Al bonding to be metallic. Stabilization of [Cp*Al] relative to [CpAl] is thought to arise from addition of H-H interactions on the methyl groups attached to the Cp* ligand as opposed to the increased Al-Al bonding interactions.

Despite its typically tetrameric form, the monomer Cp*Al has been isolated and studied in the gas-phase using gas-phase electron diffraction. In its gaseous monomeric form, the perpendicular distance between the Al to the Cp* ring was calculated to be 206.3(8) pm, which is slightly longer than tetrameric [Cp*Al].

Reactivity 
When isolated in a solid H doped Ar matrix, monomeric Cp*Al has shown to form the hydride species HCp*Al upon exposure to H and photolysis with a Hg lamp:

At temperatures above 100 °C, [Cp*Al] decomposes to form pentamethylcyclopentandiene (Cp*H), metallic aluminium (Al(0)) and other non-volatile Al(III) compounds. The overall stability of [Cp*Al] is unique as there is a thermodynamic affinity for tetrameric aluminium(I) compounds ([RAl]) to disproportionate into elemental aluminium and RAl. As such, a number of different novel oligomeric structures can be synthesised when using tetrameric [Cp*Al] as a precursor. For example, treatment of [Cp*Al] with excess selenium and tellurium in mild conditions gives the unique heterocubane structures [Cp*AlSe] and [Cp*AlTe] respectively. These heterocubane structures are extremely air and moisture sensitive, leading to its decomposition and evolution of HSe and HTe respectively. Analogously, reaction of [Cp*Al] with lighter chalcogens such as O, NO and sulfur yield [Cp*AlX] (X = O, S).

[Cp*Al] was also the used as a precursor to synthesize the first ever stable dimeric iminoalane containing an AlN heterocycle through the treatment of [Cp*Al] with MeSiN in a 1:4 molar ratio. The resultant iminoalanes was characterized to contain an ideally planar AlN core ring with three coordinate aluminium and nitrogen atoms. Other dimeric iminoalanes including [Cp*AlNSi(i-Pr)], [Cp*AlNSiPh] and [Cp*AlNSi(t-Bu)] have since been synthesized using [Cp*Al] as a precursor through oxidative addition of an organic azide.

Function as a ligand 

[Cp*Al] is able to act as an atypical exotic ligand in donor-acceptor type bonds. For example, mixing [Cp*Al] with the Lewis acidic B(CF) forms the Al-B donor-acceptor type bond, and results in the synthesis of the adduct [Cp*Al-B(CF)]. Analogous main-group complexes that have been synthesised and characterised include dialane complexes [Cp*Al-Al(CF)] and [Cp*Al-Al(t-Bu)], and group 13-group 13 complexes [Cp*Al-Ga(t-Bu)].

[Cp*Al] is also able to act as a potent ligand to transition metals.  For example, treatment of [Cp*Al] with [(dcpe)Pt(H)(CHt-Bu)] (dcpe = bis(dicyclohexylphosphino)ethane) yields [(dcpe)Pt(Cp*Al)]. Other transition metals which use [Cp*Al] as a ligand include, but are not limited to d metal centre complexes such as [Pd(Cp*Al)] and [Ni(Cp*Al)], and lanthanide/actinide metal centre complexes such as (CpSiMe)U-AlCp*, (CpSiMe)3Nd-AlCp* and (CpSiMe)Ce-AlCp*.

References 

Organoaluminium compounds
Pentamethylcyclopentadienyl complexes
Aluminium(I) compounds